James William Tutt (26 April 1858–10 January 1911) was an English schoolteacher and entomologist. He was a founding editor of the journal Entomologists' Record from 1890 and published a landmark series on the British Lepidoptera in which he described numerous species of moths and was among the first to notice industrial melanism in the pepper moth Biston betularia and was among the first to provide a clear explanation of their increasing frequency based on the role of crypsis, natural selection by predators, and the effect of changed environmental conditions brought on by industrialism.

Tutt was born in Strood, Kent and went to the St. Nicholas Schools before going to St. Mark's Training College, Chelsea in 1876. He matriculated in the University of London and became a headmaster at Snowfields Board School followed by Webb Street School and Higher Grade School in Portman Place. Tutt was interested in insects from the age of thirteen but became more scientific after meeting lepidopterist George Coverdale in 1881. Tutt was active in London scientific societies including the Entomological Society of London which he joined in 1885. A major contribution was his explanation of melanism that he noted in several insects including the famed pepper moth. He noted this in Yorkshire and provided a selectionist (based on Darwinian natural selection) explanation synthesized from ideas proposed by contemporaries including Buchanan White and Nicholas Cooke. Tutt was a keen popularizer, giving talks to the public on many occasions, and a listener of one was inspired to contribute a poem to Punch magazine:
Mr Tutt, who tells no lies, 
Tells us that the butterflies
Are alas, what do you think? 
Let me whisper, fond of drink!
He has watched them on the flow’rs 
Where they’ll sit and suck for hours,
Quite devoid of any motion 
Save absorption of the ’lotion.
Thus they spend the summer’s day
While the females work away,
For this craving to regale 
Is restricted to the male.
Lost illusion of our youth 
In a scientific truth, 
Tear drops gather in our eyes 
When we think of butterflies.

Tutt had a congenital heart condition but lived without much trouble. He died at his home in Rayleigh Villa, Westcombe Hill. He was buried at Lewisham Cemetery now renamed Ladywell Cemetery of borough of Lewisham's twinned 'Brockley & Ladywell Cemeteries'. Tutt had been married to Frances Marsh Collins and they had two sons and three daughters.

Tutt was the author of The British Noctuae and their Varieties (1891–92), Natural History of the British Lepidoptera (1890–1911),  Practical hints for the Field lepidopterist (1901) and A natural history of the British Lepidoptera. A text-book for students and collectors (1908).

References

External links 
 A natural history of the British Lepidoptera (scanned volumes)
 The British noctuæ and their varieties
 Rambles in Alpine Valleys (1895)
 Memorials
 Practical hints for the field lepidopterist (1908)

1858 births
1911 deaths
English entomologists